The Bunjevac dialect, also known as Bunjevac speech, is a Neo-Shtokavian–Younger Ikavian dialect of the Serbo-Croatian pluricentric language, preserved among members of the Bunjevac community. Their accent is purely Ikavian, with /i/ for the Common Slavic vowels yat. There are three branches of the Neo-Shtokavian–Younger Ikavian dialect: Dalmatian, Danubian, and Littoral-Lika. Its speakers largely use the Latin alphabet and are living in parts of Bosnia and Herzegovina, different parts of Croatia, southern parts (inc. Budapest) of Hungary as well in nothern parts of the autonomous province Vojvodina of Serbia. Bunjevac dialect has been included in the list of official public administrative languages of the Subotica Municipality in Serbia since 2021. And Croatia added in 2021 the Bunjevac dialect to the list of protected intangible cultural heritage. Within the Bunjevac community and between Serbia and Croatia is for several decades an ongoing language battle about the status of Bunjevac speech.

Dictionary 
There have been three meritorious people who preserved the Bunjevac dialect in two separate dictionaries: Grgo Bačlija and Marko Peić with "Rečnik bački Bunjevaca" (editions 1990, 2018), and Ante Sekulić with "Rječnik govora bačkih Hrvata" (2005).

 "Bunjevac dialect of the hinterland of Senje with special consideiration of emphasis." Grga Tomljenović. Croatia. 1984
 Bunjevac phrases and proverbs in Gara, Hungary. "Bunjevačke fraze i poslovice u Gari". Tomislav Krekić. 2016
 Bunjevac speech in Tavankut, Serbia. "Govor Tavankuta". Mirjana Crnković. 2015

Number of speakers
In the 2002 census results published by the Statistical Office of Serbia, Bunjevac speech was not listed among main languages spoken in Serbia, but those that declared that their language is Bunjevac were listed in category "other languages". For example, in the municipality of Subotica, the number of those listed as speaking "other languages" (presumably Bunjevac) was 8,914.

According to the 2011 census in Serbia, 6,835 people declared Bunjevac dialect as their mother tongue (bunjevački maternji jezik) and it was listed independently.

Status

Opinions on the status of the Bunjevac dialect remain divided. Bunjevac speech is considered a dialect or vernacular of the Serbo-Croatian pluricentric language, by linguists. It is noted by Andrew Hodges that it is mutually intelligible with the standard Serbian and Croatian varieties. Popularly, the Bunjevac dialect is often referred to as "Bunjevac language" or Bunjevac mother tongue. At the political level, depending on goal and content of the political lobby, the general confusion concerning the definition of the terms language, dialect, speech, mother tongue, is cleverly exploited, resulting in an inconsistent use of the terms. 

In the old Austro-Hungarian censuses (for example one from 1910), Bunjevac was declared as a native language of numerous citizens (for example in the city of Subotica 33,247 people declared Bunjevac as their native language in 1910). During the existence of the Kingdom of Yugoslavia and the Socialist Federal Republic of Yugoslavia, members of the Bunjevac ethnic community mostly declared themselves as speaking Serbo-Croatian.

According to the 2002 census in Serbia, some members of the Bunjevac ethnic community declared that their native language to be Serbian or Croatian. This does not mean that they do not use this specific dialect, but merely that they do not consider it sufficiently distinct from the aforementioned standard languages to register as speakers of a separate language. However, those Bunjevci who declared Bunjevac to be their native language consider it a separate language.

The dialect, of the in Serbia residating Danubian Bunjevci, was standardized in the Republic of Serbia in 2018 and officially approved as a standard dialect by the Ministry of Education for teaching in schools. Speakers use in general the standardized dialect variety for writing and conversation in formal situations. Theodora Vuković has provided, in 2009, the scientific methodology for the finalization of the standardization process of the Bunjevac dialect corpus in Serbia, classified as the Serbian Bunjevac dialect variety of the Danubian branch of the Neo-Shtokavian–Younger Ikavian dialect.

There is an ongoing wish among the members of the Bunjevac community for affirmation of their dialect in Croatia, Hungary, and in Serbia. The Bunjevac National Council has the following projects in Bunjevac dialect in Serbia: Montley newspaper "Bunjevačke novine", TV programme "Spektar" (broadcaststed by Radio Television of Vojvodina), and a language school program for Bunjevac dialect and culture "bunjevački govor s elementima nacionalne kulture". The Croat National Council in Subotica is organizing the yearly Bunjevac Song Contest "Festival bunjevački' pisama"

On March 4, 2021, the municipal council in Subotica has voted in favor of amending the city statute adding Bunjevac dialect to the list of official public administrative languages in the municipality, in addition to Serbian, Hungarian, and Croatian. This has created a special situation that contradicts the official position, of both the Serbian government and Matica Srpska, that classified Bunjevac speech as a dialect. Also other scholars from Serbia and Croatia confirm the linguistic dialect status of the Bunjevac speech.

The Institute of Croatian Language and Linguistics launched a proposal, in March 2021, to the Ministry of Culture of the Republic of Croatia, to add Bunjevac dialect to the List of Protected Intangible Cultural Heritage of the Republic of Croatia and was approved on 8 October 2021 — the three Bunjevac dialect branches are categorised by Croatia as New-Stockavian Ikavian dialects of the Stockavian dialect of the Croatian language. 

The status of the Bunjevac dialect and the identity and nationality dispute of people calling themselves Bunjevac or Bunjevac-Croat, has been on the political agenda of stakeholders involved for decades, influencing bilateral cooperation between Croatia and Serbia, domestic political developments in Serbia and Croatia, and the implementation of political decisions of the EU.

Organisations 
 Bunjevac Croatian Cultural and Educational Society in Serbia; HKPD Matija Gubec Tavankut
 Bunjevac Cultural Institute, "Bunyevác Kulturális Intézet" in Baja in Hungary; www.bunyevacintezet.hu
 Bunjevac National Council in Serbia; www.bunjevci.net
 Bunjevačka matica (under auspices of Bunjevac National Council); www.bunjevacka-matica.rs
 Bunjevci, "Vrilo mudrosti" in Slavonski Brod in Croatia, www.vrilo-mudrosti.hr
 Croat National Council in Serbia (Bunjevci, Coats, Šokci), www.hnv.org.rs
 Croatian Cultural Centre "Bunjevačko kolo" for Croats, Bunjevci, and Sokci in Serbia; m.facebook.com/hkcbunjevackokolosubotica
 Ogranak Matice hrvatske u Subotici; www.matica.hr/ogranci/Subotica/; Matica hrvatska

External links

Linguistic institutes & Universities 
 Fakultät Sprach-, Literatur- und Kulturwissenschaften - TU Dresden
 Institut za hrvatski jezik i jezikoslovlje - Zagreb - Institute of Croatian Language and Linguistics
 Linguistics Research Institute - Budapest
 Multilingualism - Rijksuniversiteit Groningen
 Research Institute Linguistics - Mercator Network
 Serbian Academy of Sciences and Arts - SANU
 Slavic-Eurasian Research Center - 北海道大学 - Sapporo

Newspaper (digital) 
 Bunjevački govor ostaje u školama - Politika (7 November 2015)
 Bunjevački jezik u školskom programu - Blic. Dragan Šolaja (25 October 2007)
 Deset godina bunjevačkog govora u osnovnim školama - subotica.info (11 November 2016)

Sources for further reading 
 An opinion on the Bunjevac dialect, issued by Croatian Academy of Sciences and Arts, at the request of the Council of Vojvodina Croats
 Bunjevci. Etnodijalektološka istraživanja 2009. Žarko Bošnjaković, Biljana Sikimić. 2013 
 Bunjevci in Senj (Croatia) 
 Der Ausbau des Bunjewatzischen zu einer südslavischen Mikroliteratursprache. Martin Henzelmann. 2016
 Hrvatska revija br. 3/2005. Proslava 250. obljetnice doseljavanja veće skupine Bunjevaca (1686.-1936.) – Bunjevci u jugoslavenskoj državi. Stevan Mačković
 Hungarian views of the Bunjevci in Habsburg times and the inter-war period. Eric Beckett Weaver. 2011
 Međunarodni znanstveni skup "Jugoistočna Europa 1918.-1995." Stjepan Matković. 1996
 O Bunjevcima. Ivan Ivanić. 1894
 Politics and the Slavic Languages. Tomasz Kamusella. 2021
 The Politics Of Language And Nationalism In Modern Central Europe. Tomasz Kamusella. 2008
 What does the case of Vojvodina tell us about multilingualism, mobility, inclusion and power relations? Edgár Dobos. 2018

Notes

Bunjevci
Dialects of Serbo-Croatian
Languages of Croatia
Languages of Serbia
Languages of Vojvodina